Aethria haemorrhoidalis is a moth of the subfamily Arctiinae. It was described by Stoll in 1790. It is found in Belize, Ecuador, Guyana, Suriname and Brazil.

References

Moths described in 1790
Arctiinae
Moths of Central America
Moths of South America